This is a list of the governors of the province of Logar, Afghanistan.

Governors of Logar Province

See also
 List of current governors of Afghanistan

Notes

Logar